Hannah Jones may refer to:

 Hannah Jones (Lancashire cricketer), English cricketer who plays for Lancashire and North West Thunder
 Hannah Jones (Surrey cricketer), English cricketer who plays for Surrey and South East Stars
 Hannah Jones (snooker player) (born 1996), British snooker player
 Hannah Jones (singer), British singer
 Hannah Maria Jones (c. 1784–1854), Victorian novelist
 Hannah M. Jones, American artist and musician
 Hannah Vaughan Jones, British journalist and presenter
 Hannah Jones (rugby union) (born 1996), Welsh rugby union player
 Hannah Jones, a recurring character in the American television series 12 Monkeys

See also
 Nikole Hannah-Jones, American journalist